Renda Broadcasting (RBC) is a privately held Pittsburgh-based radio broadcasting company founded by chief executive, Tony Renda.

Renda Broadcasting operates stations in Pennsylvania and Florida. Most stations are identified as “A hometown radio station.”

Stations
Pittsburgh
WSHH 99.7 – Adult contemporary

Indiana, Pennsylvania
WDAD 1450 – Classic Hits
WQMU 92.5 – Hot AC
WCCS 1160 – News/Talk
WLCY 106.3 – Country

Punxsutawney, Pennsylvania
WPXZ-FM 104.1 – Adult contemporary
WECZ 1540 – Sports
WKQL 103.3 – Classic hits

Greensburg, Pennsylvania
WHJB 107.1 – Classic hits

Jacksonville, Florida
96.1 WEJZ – Adult contemporary
99.9 Gator Country WGNE-FM – Country

Fort Myers/Naples, Florida
WWGR 101.9 – Country
WJGO 102.9 – Bob FM
WGUF 98.9 – Talk
WSGL 104.7 – Hot AC

References 
Renda Signals Growth in Radio

External links
Renda Broadcasting

Mass media companies of the United States
Companies based in Pittsburgh
Radio broadcasting companies of the United States
Renda Broadcasting radio stations